The 2018–19 Legia Warsaw season is the club's 102st season of existence, and their 82nd in the top flight of Polish football. Legia entered the 2018–19 season as the defending Ekstraklasa champions.

Players

Current squad

Out on loan

Transfers

In

Out

Competitions

Friendlies

Polish Super Cup

Polish Cup

Ekstraklasa

Regular season

League table

Championship Round

League table

Champions League

First qualifying round

Legia Warsaw won 4–0 on aggregate.

Second qualifying round

Spartak Trnava won 2–1 on aggregate.

Europa League

Third qualifying round

F91 Dudelange won 4–3 on aggregate.

Statistics

Notes

References

External links

Legia Warsaw seasons
Legia Warsaw
Legia Warsaw
Legia Warsaw